Mozelos is a civil parish in the municipality of Paredes de Coura, Portugal. The population in 2011 was 347, in an area of 3.36 km2.

References

Freguesias of Paredes de Coura